Charles Hawtrey may refer to:

*Charles Hawtrey (actor, born 1858) (1858–1923), British stage (and early silent film) actor, producer and theatre manager
Charles Hawtrey (actor, born 1914) (1914–1988), British film and television actor, born George Hartree, best known for the Carry On films